Dmitri Ivanovich Yatchenko (born 25 August 1986) is a Russian former footballer who played as a right-back.

Career
Yatchenko began his career with FC Dynamo Moscow. In January 2006, he signed with FC Spartak Nalchik. On 28 December 2009, FC Terek Grozny signed the wingback from Spartak Nalchik on a two-year deal. On 29 December 2013, Yatchenko signed a two-and-a-half-year deal with Krylia Sovetov.
On 26 February 2020, Yatchenko signed for Shakhter Karagandy.

Career statistics

Club

Personal life
He is an identical twin brother of Yevgeni Yatchenko.

References

External links
 
 
 
 

1986 births
Footballers from Moscow
Living people
Russian footballers
Twin sportspeople
Russia under-21 international footballers
Russia national football B team footballers
Association football defenders
Russian expatriate footballers
Expatriate footballers in Belarus
Expatriate footballers in Kazakhstan
FC Dynamo Moscow reserves players
PFC Spartak Nalchik players
Russian twins
Russian Premier League players
FC Akhmat Grozny players
PFC Krylia Sovetov Samara players
FC Yenisey Krasnoyarsk players
FC Dinamo Minsk players
FC Shakhter Karagandy players
FC Akron Tolyatti players